Newton Exchange is a bus loop located in the central Newton area of Surrey, British Columbia, Canada. As part of the TransLink system, it serves Newton with routes to Surrey City Centre, North Delta, Richmond, Langley City and White Rock, which provide connections to several SkyTrain stations for travel towards Vancouver.

Structure and location
The exchange opened on May 30, 1975, and is located on the southeast corner of 72 Avenue and 137 Street; it has a loop layout with several shelters. It was rebuilt in 1986 and again in 2013 to improve efficiency and to accommodate the introduction of the 96 B-Line service.

Newton Exchange is adjacent to the Newton Wave Pool. There are also several retail outlets located nearby, including King's Cross retail outlet. There is a cinema, civic recreation centre, and library located south of the facility. The bus loop is patrolled by the Metro Vancouver Transit Police.

Routes
, the following routes serve Newton Exchange:

See also

References

External links

TransLink (British Columbia) bus stations
Transport in Surrey, British Columbia
1975 establishments in British Columbia